Oddities is a half-hour  documentary/reality television program which follows the operation of an East Village, Manhattan shop which trades in antiques and other rarities. The show premiered on November 4, 2010, and airs on the Discovery Channel and its sister network, the Science Channel.

Oddities focuses on the day-to-day operation of Obscura Antiques & Oddities, and stars co-owners Mike Zohn and Evan Michelson and buyer Ryan Matthew Cohn, with appearances by other employees and customers. The store's employees search flea markets, personal collections, auctions, and antique shows for unique and unusual artifacts. Odd items bought and sold by the shop or featured on the show have included a mummified cat, a rhesus monkey skull, art made from nail clippings, and a straitjacket.

Celebrities appearing on the show have included Jonathan Davis of the band Korn, Whitey Sterling, singer for the New York band Stiffs, Inc., musician Genesis P-Orridge, actress/comedian Amy Sedaris, actor Matthew Gray Gubler, artist Ann Hirsch, actress Chloë Sevigny, musician Natalia Paruz ('Saw Lady'), video game designer and commercial space flight enthusiast Richard Garriott, director Lloyd Kaufman, nerdcore rapper Schaffer The Darklord, musician Voltaire, musician Moby, artist Cynthia von Buhler, actor/comedian Paul Dinello, burlesque dancer Dita Von Teese, and "High Pitch Eric" of The Howard Stern Show. New York playwright Edgar Oliver has appeared on the program multiple times and appears in the show's title sequence admiring a straitjacket.

Episodes

Season 1: 2010–2011

Season 2: 2011

Season 3: 2011–2012

Season 4: 2013–2014

Season 5: 2014

Spinoffs
A spinoff of Oddities, Oddities: San Francisco, debuted June 23, 2012 on the Science Channel with co-star Wednesday Mourning. This series focuses on another antiques store, Loved to Death, which is located in San Francisco's Haight-Ashbury district. It has since been cancelled.

Another spinoff, Odd Folks Home, features notable regulars from Oddities and debuted November 22, 2012. It has since been cancelled.

See also
Pawn Stars, about a Las Vegas pawn shop
American Pickers, starring itinerant buyers of antiques and collectibles
American Restoration, chronicling the daily activities at Rick's Restorations, an antique restoration store

References

External links

Oddities at Internet Movie Database
Discovery Channel – About the show

Discovery Insider interview
Discovery Channel – Episode Guide
Obscura Antiques & Oddities website

2010 American television series debuts
2014 American television series endings
2010s American documentary television series
2010s American reality television series
Television shows set in New York City
Discovery Channel original programming
Science Channel original programming
Antiques television series